Chanta may refer to:

 Chanta (dog), a fictional dog in the manga series Inubaka: Crazy for Dogs
 Çanta, Istanbul, a town in Silivri district of Istanbul Province, Turkey